Malcolm Hope Terris (11 January 1941 – 6 June 2020) was an English actor.

He acted in many television programmes, including possibly his best-known role as Matt Headley in When the Boat Comes In, a popular 1970s series.

His film career includes appearances in Special Branch (1973), The First Great Train Robbery (1978), McVicar (1980), The Plague Dogs (1982, voice only), Slayground (1983), The Bounty (1984) as Thomas Huggan, ship's surgeon, Mata Hari (1985), Revolution (1985), Scandal (1989), and Chaplin (1992).

His TV appearances include:

"The Horns of Nimon" episodes of Doctor Who (season 17) (1979–80). One episode of Rooms (1974) and four episodes of the mini-series Reilly, Ace of Spies (1983).
Regular episodes of Coronation Street, mostly as Eric Firman in the early 1990s.
In April 2011 he appeared as Len Merryman in an episode of Midsomer Murders.

In 1958, and prior to going to drama school, Terris was a trainee reporter on the Sunderland Echo, the town's evening paper.

References

External links

1941 births
2020 deaths
English male television actors
People from Sunderland
Male actors from Tyne and Wear